Mogsokhon is a rural locality (a selo) in Kizhinginsky District, Republic of Buryatia, Russia. The population was 1,120 as of 2010. There are 15 streets.

Geography 
Mogsokhon is located 39 km east of Kizhinga (the district's administrative centre) by road. Mikhaylovka is the nearest rural locality.

References 

Rural localities in Kizhinginsky District